Persian people were one of the major ethnic groups, who accompanied the ethnic Turco-Mongol ruling elite of the Mughal Empire after its invasion of the Indian subcontinent. Throughout the Mughal Empire, a number of ethnic Persian technocrats, bureaucrats, traders, scientists, architects, teachers, poets, artists, theologians and Sufis migrated and settled in different parts of the Indian Subcontinent.

The name Mughal is derived from the original homelands of the Timurids, the Central Asian (Turkestan) steppes once conquered by Genghis Khan and hence known as Moghulistan, "Land of Mongols". Although early Mughals spoke the Chagatai language and maintained some Turko-Mongol practices, they became essentially Persianized and transferred the Persian literary and high culture to South Asia, thus forming the base for the Indo-Persian culture and the Spread of Islam in South Asia.

Humayun refuge in Persia

Mughal Emperor Humayun was defeated by Sher Shah Suri in 1540 and fled to the refuge of the powerful Safavid Empire in Iran, marching with 40 men and his wife. Shah Tahmasp welcomed the Mughal, and treated him as a royal visitor. Here Humayun went sightseeing and was amazed at the Persian artwork, military might and architecture he saw: much of this was the work of the Timurid Sultan Husayn Bayqarah and his ancestor, princess Gauhar Shad, thus he was able to admire the work of his relatives and ancestors at first hand. He was introduced to the work of the Persian miniaturists, and Kamaleddin Behzad had two of his pupils join Humayun in his court. Humayun was amazed at their work and asked if they would work for him if he were to regain the sovereignty of Hindustan and they agreed. 

Shah Tahmasp provided financial aid and a large choice of cavalry to regain his Empire. Persians nobles and soldiers joined Humayun in reconquest of South Asia. 

The Turkic Turani nobility tended to fade away from the political scene and the Persian nobles improved their position. During 1545–1555 A.D. a number of Persians who came in Humayun's service were appointed to important central offices, such as diwan, wazir, and mir-saman (in charge of the Imperial Palace).

Ma'âṣer al-Omarâ
Ma'âṣer al-Omarâ was written by Shah Nawaz Khan and his son, 'Abd al-Hayy in 1780. This book contains the biographies of 738 Mughal nobles of which at least 198 or 26.8 per cent were Persians

Contribution to Urdu
The mother-tongue of the recently-immigrated Persians was Persian, while Urdu was the mother-tongue of the Indian-born persians who made 75% of the Shi'a Persian group of nobles in India. One example was the family of Ali Mardan Khan, an ethnic Kurdish Safavid turncoat governor of Kandahar, whose son Ibrahim Khan and grandson Zabardast Khan respectively continued to maintain ranks as nobles. The son of Zabardast Khan, Sadr-ud-Din Khan, wrote the first Urdu Diwan in Northern India in 1715. He describes in the Risala-i Munazrat that he participated in Mushairas and academic gatherings at the residence of the Indian Muslim Mir Bakhshi Khan-i Dauran, the Amir-ul-Umara and Commander-in-Chief of the army of Muhammad Shah. Sadr-ud-Din Khan exerted considerable influence on the contemporary writers and poets and his literary output enriched Urdu literature. In the preface to his Kulliyat, he has expounded his own theories of the art of composing poetry.

Reasons for Immigration
Most of the Persians migrated to South Asia to prosper and obtain high positions in Mughal Empire. Many were Sunni Persians who felt discriminated in Shia Safavid Empire and migrated to mostly Sunni Mughal Empire. There were also rebels and nobles who lost royal favour and migrated to Mughal Empire. The Mughals also preferred to employ foreign Muslim officials that had little or no local interests and thus were loyal to the Mughal emperor.

Awadh State

The most important Shia state in South Asia was established by Persian originally from Khurasan in Persia around 1722 AD with Faizabad as its capital and Sadat Ali Khan as its first Nawab. Awadh or Avadh is also known in various British historical texts as Oudh.

Qizilbash
The Qizilbash soldiers and officials settled in modern Pakistan during Mughal Emperor Humayun's return from exile in Safavid Persia and restoration of Mughal Empire. Emperor Humayun lost his South Asian territories to the Pashtun noble, Sher Shah Suri, and, with Persian aid, regained them 15 years later in 1555 AD.

See also
 Mughal Empire
 Indo-Persian culture
 Persian language in South Asia
 Iranian invasion of Indus Valley

References

External links 
 Emigration of Iranian Elites to India during the 16–18th centuries
 Role of Persians at the Mughal Court:A Historical study, during 1526 to 1707 AD
 

Asian people of Iranian descent
Mughal Empire
Persian people
South Asian people